Mr. Opp is a 1917 American silent drama film directed by Lynn Reynolds and starring Arthur Hoyt, George Chesebro and George Hernandez.

Cast
 Arthur Hoyt as Mr. D. Webster Opp
 George Chesebro as Willard Hinton
 George Hernandez as Jimmy Fallows
 Jack Curtis as John Mathews
 Neva Gerber as Guinevere Gusty
 Elsie Maison as Miss Kippy
 Anne Lockhart as Mrs. Gusty
 Jane Bernoudy as Jemima Fenny

References

Bibliography
 Goble, Alan. The Complete Index to Literary Sources in Film. Walter de Gruyter, 1999.

External links
 

1917 films
1917 drama films
1910s English-language films
American silent feature films
Silent American drama films
American black-and-white films
Universal Pictures films
Films directed by Lynn Reynolds
1910s American films